Children of the World is an album by saxophonist Stan Getz featuring compositions by Lalo Schifrin to commemorate the International Year of the Child which was recorded in 1978 and originally released on the Columbia label. The album cover art features Charles M. Schulz's Peanuts cartoon of Snoopy on saxophone and Schroeder on piano.

Reception

The Allmusic review by Scott Yanow stated "It is not the electronics of Andy LaVerne that is bothersome on this LP but the poppish material (which includes the theme from Evita) and the excessive amount of keyboardists and guitarists. Stan Getz cannot be blamed for trying something new (he even uses an Echoplex sparingly) and his cool-toned tenor is in fine form but the overall results are rather forgettable".

Track listing
All compositions by Lalo Schifrin except where noted.
 "Don't Cry for Me Argentina" (Andrew Lloyd Webber, Tim Rice) – 4:31
 "Children of the World" – 5:36
 "Livin' It Up" – 5:27
 "Street Tattoo" (Schifrin, Gale Garnett) – 5:14
 "Hopscotch" – 3:21
 "On Rainy Afternoons" (Schifrin, Alan Bergman, Marilyn Bergman) – 2:39
 "You, Me and the Spring" – 6:45
 "Summer Poem" – 8:21
 "The Dreamer" – 5:46
 "Around the Day in Eighty Worlds" – 6:53

Personnel 
Stan Getz – tenor saxophone, echoplex
Andy LaVerne – piano, electric piano, keyboards
Lalo Schifrin – piano, arranger, conductor
Sonny Burke (tracks 1, 4 & 6), Mike Long, Clark Spangler – synthesizer
Mike Melvoin – electric piano
Dennis Budimir, Paul Jackson (tracks 1, 4 & 6), Tim May – guitar
Stanley Clarke (tracks 1 & 4), Abe Laboriel – electric bass
Victor Jones – drums 
Larry Bunker, Paulinho da Costa, Steve Forman (tracks 1 & 4), Joe Porcaro, Bob Zimmitti (tracks 1 & 4) – percussion
Marc Bell, Douglas Colvin, John Cummings, Tommy Erdelyi, Jeff Hyman, Richie Reinhardt, Christopher Joseph Ward – vocals (track 5)

References 

1979 albums
Stan Getz albums
Columbia Records albums
Albums arranged by Lalo Schifrin
Albums conducted by Lalo Schifrin